Elections to the Provincial Assembly of Balochistan were held in 1976.

Results

References 

Elections in Balochistan